Bira is a census town in the Habra II CD block in the  Barasat Sadar subdivision of the North 24 Parganas district in the state of West Bengal, India.

Geography

Location

Area overview
The area covered in the map alongside is largely a part of the north Bidyadhari Plain. located in the lower Ganges Delta. The country is flat. It is a little raised above flood level and the highest ground borders the river channels.54.67% of the people of the densely populated area lives in the urban areas and 45.33% lives in the rural  areas.

Note: The map alongside presents some of the notable locations in the subdivision. All places marked in the map are linked in the larger full screen map.

Demographics
According to the 2011 Census of India, Bira had a total population of 10,741, of which 5,471 (51%) were males and 5,270 (49%) were females. Population in the age range 0-6 years was 1,095. The total number of literate persons in  Bira was 8,361 (86.68% of the population over 6 years).

Infrastructure
According to the District Census Handbook, North Twenty Four Parganas,  2011, Bira covered an area of 3.9142 km2. It had 1.5 kmroads with open drains. The protected water-supply involved hand pumps. It had 2,175 domestic electric connections, 50 road-light points. Among the educational facilities, it had 3 primary schools, 2 middle schools, 2 secondary schools, 2 higher secondary schools. The nearest college was 10 km away at Habra. It is well-known for its embroidery work, bags, trunks. It has the branch office of 1 nationalised bank.

References

Cities and towns in North 24 Parganas district